The Power Station is the debut album by the supergroup The Power Station, released in 1985 on Capitol Records. The album peaked at no. 6 on the US Billboard 200 and no. 12 on the UK Albums Chart. All three singles released from the album were Top 40 hits in the United States. An anniversary edition was released 21 February 2005, featuring 7 bonus tracks, as well as a 35-minute DVD.

Background 
The Power Station was a supergroup formed by Robert Palmer, Tony Thompson (of Chic) and Andy and John Taylor from Duran Duran. They came together in 1984 to record a one-off album, as a respite from the relentless global touring and promotion of Duran Duran.

The original plan for this one-album project was for the three musicians (Taylor, Taylor and Thompson) to provide musical continuity to an album full of material, with a different singer performing on each track. Those who were approached included Mick Jagger, Billy Idol, Mars Williams (who eventually contributed brass to the album) and Richard Butler (of The Psychedelic Furs), and Mick Ronson.

The group then invited eclectic soul singer Robert Palmer to record vocals for the track "Communication". When he heard that they had recorded demos for "Get It On (Bang a Gong)", he asked to try out vocals on that one as well, and by the end of the day, the group knew that they had found that elusive chemistry which distinguishes successful bands. Before long, they had decided to record the entire album with Palmer.

However, the union was not to hold. By the time the band decided to take the 8-track set on the road, Palmer had left to record his solo album Riptide (which, likely because of the involvement of The Power Station participants Edwards, Thompson, and Andy Taylor, is very similar in sound to The Power Station album). He was replaced by Michael Des Barres (famed for co-writing Animotion's "Obsession").

During the promotion cycle for the album, EMI released three singles, including the cover of T. Rex's "Get It On". Versions of these three singles are now included among the bonus tracks on the 2005 re-release.

In addition, the re-release also includes the song "Somewhere, Somehow, Someone's Gonna Pay", the only known Power Station song featuring Michael Des Barres on lead vocals. The song was used for the end titles of the Arnold Schwarzenegger action film Commando and was titled "We Fight for Love".

Title 
While the actual name of the album is The Power Station, the specific formats were adopted as part of the name (similar to PiL's 1986 Album), thus The Power Station 33 vinyl album, and The Power Station CD on Compact Disc.

Track listing
All songs written by Robert Palmer, Andy Taylor and John Taylor; except where noted
Side one
"Some Like It Hot"  – 5:05
"Murderess"  – 4:17
"Lonely Tonight" (Bernard Edwards, Palmer) – 3:58
"Communication" (Derek Bramble, Palmer, Andy Taylor, John Taylor) – 3:37

Side two
"Get It On (Bang a Gong)" (Marc Bolan) – 5:29
"Go to Zero"  (Guy Pratt, Palmer) – 4:58
"Harvest for the World" (Isley Brothers) – 3:37
"Still in Your Heart"  – 3:20

2005 re-release bonus tracks
"Someday, Somehow, Someone's Gotta Pay" – 4:32
"The Heat Is On" – 3:18
"Communication" [Long Remix] – 4:39
"Get It On (Bang a Gong)" [7"] (Bolan) – 3:45
"Some Like It Hot and the Heat Is On" – 6:36
"Communication" [Remix] – 3:51
"Some Like It Hot" [7"] – 3:44

Charts

Personnel
The Power Station
 Robert Palmer – lead and backing vocals
 Andy Taylor – guitars, co-lead vocals on "Harvest for the World"
 John Taylor – bass
 Tony Thompson – drums

Additional musicians
 Michael Des Barres - lead vocals on track 9
 Curtis King Jr, Fonzi Thornton, B.J. Nelson, Charmaine Burch – additional vocals
 Lenny Pickett, Mark Pender, Stan Harrison, "Hollywood" Paul Litteral, Mars Williams – brass
 Roger Taylor, Jimmy Bralower – percussive effects
 Wally Badarou, David LeBolt, Robert Sabino, Rupert Hine – keyboards

Production
 Produced by Bernard Edwards
 Recorded and Engineered by Jason Corsaro, Steve Rinkoff and Rob Eaton
 Mixed by Jason Corsaro
 Mastered by Howie Weinberg at Masterdisk, New York

References

1985 debut albums
The Power Station (band) albums
Albums produced by Bernard Edwards
Parlophone albums
EMI Records albums
Capitol Records albums